Nikolayevka is a rural locality (a selo) and the administrative center of Nikolayevskoye Rural Settlement, Anninsky District, Voronezh Oblast, Russia. The population was 1,188 as of 2010. There are 9 streets.

Geography 
Nikolayevka is located 12 km northwest of Anna (the district's administrative centre) by road. Sofyinka is the nearest rural locality.

References 

Rural localities in Anninsky District